Thomas McMahon may refer to:
 Thomas McMahon (Irish republican) (born 1948), IRA member
 Thomas McMahon (bishop) (born 1936), Roman Catholic bishop of Brentwood
 Thomas A. McMahon (1943–1999), novelist and professor of applied mechanics and biology at Harvard University
Thomas John McMahon (1864–1933), Australian photojournalist
 Thomas J. McMahon (1948–1969), American soldier and Medal of Honor recipient
 Sir Thomas McMahon, 2nd Baronet (1779–1860), commander-in-chief of Bombay, 1840–1847
 Sir Thomas Westropp McMahon, 3rd Baronet (1813–1892), British Army officer
 Tom McMahon (Democratic operative), executive director of the Democratic National Committee
 Tom McMahon (mayor), American politician and former mayor of Reading, Pennsylvania
 Tom McMahon (footballer, born 1907) (1907–1975), Australian footballer for South Melbourne and Melbourne
 Tom McMahon (footballer, born 1918) (1918–2005), Australian footballer for Footscray
 Tom McMahon (American football) (born 1969), American football coach